Neil Blackmore is a British novelist who had a success in Germany and other countries in the 1990s and 2000s with his first two novels, Soho Blues and Der Himmel über Damaskus. These books were published to great success and critical strength and Neil Blackmore toured all over the country of Germany, where his books sold very well. The books were also published in the United Kingdom (Der Himmel über Damaskus under the title of Split My Heart there).  In the UK the books were published by Orion House and were less successful than in Europe. But his books were give very good reviews by newspapers. Neil Blackmore was one of the first writers to have a writing blog, starting in the late 1990s. Bright Red, his website centered on his blog (not then called so), was one of the best known writing sites of the time, known for its humour and honesty. In 2000 The Independent newspaper named it one of the best websites on writing but Neil Blackmore stopped it a year later and seemed to disappear.

Blackmore told German fans that he had stopped writing for some years and had been travelling the world and living in London as a freelance writer. He is currently listed as a member of the long-running North London Writers circle , along with Sarah Waters and Charles Palliser.

In 2019, Penguin Books announced they would publish Blackmore's third novel The Intoxicating Mister Lavelle in 2020, having acquired World English rights.

External links
 Author site
 Aufbau-Verlag homepage with reviews (Rolling Stone/Time Out/others) (Deutsch)
 Soho Blues review (Deutsch)
 Der Himmel über Damaskus (Deutsch)
 Die Welt artikel (Deutsch)

20th-century English novelists
21st-century English novelists
English bloggers
Living people
English male novelists
20th-century English male writers
21st-century English male writers
British male bloggers
Year of birth missing (living people)